Amy Sinclair is the Iowa State Senator from the 12th District. A Republican, she has served in the Iowa Senate since 2013. She currently resides in Allerton, Iowa.

In November 2022, after Jake Chapman lost his bid for re-election to Sarah Trone Garriott, the position as President of the Senate was left vacant and Sinclair was elected to that position by the Iowa Senate.  

As of June 2016, Sinclair currently serves on the following committees: Commerce, Education, and Judiciary, Government Oversight, and Rules and Administration. She also serves on the Legislative Council and the Violence in Iowa Study Committee.

Electoral history

References

External links 
Legislator website

1975 births
21st-century American politicians
21st-century American women politicians
Democratic Party Iowa state senators
Living people
Presidents of the Iowa Senate
Women state legislators in Iowa